Reichenspergerplatz is an underground station on the Cologne Stadtbahn lines 16 and 18, located in Cologne. The station lies at Reichenspergerplatz in the district of Innenstadt.

The station was opened in 1974 and consists of a mezzanine and two side platforms with two rail tracks. Line 5 trains terminated at this station, used an underground loop that leaves from the outbound track to Niehl, and then joined with the inbound track from Buchheim.

Notable places nearby 
 Oberlandesgericht
 St. Agnes
 Neusser Straße

See also 
 List of Cologne KVB stations

References

External links 
 
 station info page 

Cologne KVB stations
Innenstadt, Cologne
Railway stations in Germany opened in 1974
Cologne-Bonn Stadtbahn stations